WWER is a Community Based radio station licensed to and serving Colonial Beach, Virginia. WWER is owned and operated by the Colonial Beach Community Foundation.

History
The Federal Communications Commission issued the original construction permit for this station on September 25, 2009. It was assigned the WWER call sign on November 3, 2009, and received its license to cover on January 29, 2010.

WWER began as a station under Fredericksburg Christian Schools in 2009. They operated the station until May 28, 2019 when the license was transferred to the Colonial Beach Community Foundation.

Under the direction of Ted Tait and Tom Larson, the station began broadcasting as Colonial Beach Community Radio on June 1, 2019.

References

External links
Colonial Beach Community Radio Online

WER
Radio stations established in 2010
2010 establishments in Virginia